Broadcasting from Home is the third studio album by the Penguin Cafe Orchestra, and was released in 1984 on E.G. Records. The opening song was named after PCO leader Simon Jeffes found a discarded harmonium in an alleyway in Japan.

The original vinyl record was pressed by Polydor from a damaged master and had a distinctive click on the first track. Polydor wouldn't pay to restore this, and fans therefore had to wait until the CD's 2008 release by Virgin (which by then had bought the Editions EG catalogue) to hear the undamaged track.

Track listing
All music composed by Simon Jeffes except as indicated

Side one

Side two

Personnel
Simon Jeffes - Harmonium, Cuatro, Guitar, Electric Guitar, Milkbottles, Triangle, Bass, Violin (4), Drum, Piano (5, 10, 12), Line Drum Computer, Ukelele (8, 10), Metal Plate, Omnichord, Soloban, Spinet, Dulcitone, Penny Whistles (11)

Marcus Beale - Electric Violin (9)
Dave Defries - Trumpet, Flugel
Kuma Harada - Bass (1, 11)
Fami - Drum (6)
Michael Giles - Drums (11)
Geoffrey Richardson - Viola, Shaker (3), Bass (10), Electric Guitar (10), Penny Whistle (10)
Helen Liebmann - Cello
Trevor Morais - Hi Hat, Wood Block, Cow Bell
Steve Nye - Piano (6, 7, 11)
Neil Rennie - Ukelele (6), Cuatro (8)
Annie Whitehead - Trombone
Gavyn Wright - Violin

References

1984 albums
Penguin Cafe Orchestra albums
Albums produced by Simon Jeffes
E.G. Records albums
Avant-pop albums